Trkaj (born Rok Terkaj, March 1, 1983) is a rapper from Slovenia and a student of theology. He won the Slovenian Freestyle Championship back in 2003 along with fellow rapper N'toko.

His prize was a record deal with RapNika, and he released his debut album V času enga diha in 2004. The album was a commercial success, but it lacked some critical acclaim indicating that Trkaj re-recorded a lot of his songs that were already online as demo songs.

In 2005, he announced a new album to be released on his birthday in March 2006, but the album wasn't released due to complications with the label. It was rescheduled to a year later and finally released in December 2007, called Rapostol.

References

External links
 Trkaj's official Web Page
 Nika Records Official 

1984 births
Slovenian rappers
Living people
Musicians from Ljubljana